Alexandre Dore Kombi Mandjang Mougui (born 1 June 1992) is a Cameroonian footballer. Mainly a midfielder, he can also play as a left back.

Club career
Mandjang joined Union Douala in 2012, after starting his career at Les Astres FC. He appeared with the former in 2013 CAF Champions League, as his side were knocked out by FUS de Rabat. In September 2016 he was signed by Slovenian club NK Domžale.

International career
Mandjang was called up to Cameroon national team on 10 November 2014, as a replacement to Moussa Bana. He made his international debut on the 25th, coming on as a second-half substitute for Benjamin Moukandjo in a 1–0 friendly win against Indonesia.

Career statistics

International

References

External links
CAF official profile

1992 births
Living people
Cameroonian footballers
Cameroonian expatriate footballers
Cameroonian expatriate sportspeople in Slovenia
Association football midfielders
Association football fullbacks
Les Astres players
Union Douala players
NK Domžale players
Slovenian PrvaLiga players
Expatriate footballers in Slovenia
Cameroon international footballers
Cameroon youth international footballers
Cameroon A' international footballers
2016 African Nations Championship players